The Gore Court Championships was a men's and women's grass court tennis event established in 1877 that ran until at least 1926. The tournament was organised by the Sittingbourne and Gore Court Archery and Lawn Tennis Club, and held at Gore Court a sports ground in Sittingbourne, Kent, England.

History
The Sittingbourne and Gore Court Archery and Lawn Tennis club was founded in 1875. In 1877 it staged its first lawn tennis tournament. In 1882 a ladies's singles open event was staged won by a Miss Ray. In 1899 the men's singles title final featured the 1898 singles champion from the Natal Championships Charles Edward Finlason and Alfred Egerton Maynard Taylor, the match ended with them dividing the title The tournament was still being staged up to at least 1926, but then appears to have been abolished.

This short but popular tournament occasionally featured a women's singles event, but did regularly feature women's doubles and mixed doubles. Former winners of the gentleman's singles has included Ernest Wool Lewis, Wilberforce Eaves and Roy Allen.

Venue
A description of the Sittingbourne and Gore Court Archery and Lawn Tennis that appeared in the Sittingbourne, Milton, and District Directory 1908 to 1909:
{{Blockquote|text=Gore Court Archery and Lawn Tennis Club. The headquarters and grounds of this old-established Club are situated at Gore Court Park, Sittingbourne. The ground is open for play each afternoon and evening during the summer months. An open lawn tennis tournament takes place in connection with the Club, generally the third week in August of each year..|title=SITTINGBOURNE|source=Sittingbourne, Milton, and District Directory 1908/09, Reprinted 1980 by W.J. Parrett Ltd, Sittingbourne. ISBN 0-9507107-0-9}}

FinalsIncomplete Roll''

Mens Singles

References

Defunct tennis tournaments in the United Kingdom
Grass court tennis tournaments